Armed and Extremely Dangerous is the debut studio album recorded by the American female vocal trio First Choice, released in 1973 on the Philly Groove label.

History
The album features the title track, which peaked at #28 on the Billboard Hot 100 and #11 on the Hot Soul Singles. Also featured are two other chart singles: "Smarty Pants" and "Newsy Neighbors".

Track listing

Personnel
Don Renaldo,  Albert Barone, Charles Apollonia, Angelo Petrella, Diane Barnett, Romeo Di Stefano, Rudy Malizia, Joe Donofrio, Christine Reeves – violins
Davis Barnett, Angelo Petrella – violas
Romeo Di Stefano – cello
Clinton Nieweg – harp
Jimmy Grant, Ronnie Baker – bass
Rocco Bene, Robert Hartzell – trumpets
Fred Linge, Richard Genovese, Edward Cascarella – bass trombones
Fred Joiner – tenor trombone
Leno Zachery – alto saxophone
Joe De Angelis, Danny Eillions, Scott Temple, Milton Phibbs – French horns
Larry Washington, James Hicks – congas and bongos
Norman Harris, Roland Chambers, Bobby Eli – guitars
Earl Young – drums
Prime Cut – musicians on "Love and Happiness"

Charts

Singles

References

External links
 

1973 debut albums
First Choice (band) albums
Albums produced by Norman Harris
Albums recorded at Sigma Sound Studios
Philly Groove Records albums